Aasai Alaigal is a 1963 Indian Tamil-language drama film directed by A. S. A. Samy and produced by J. D. Fernando. The film stars S. S. Rajendran, C. R. Vijayakumari, M. R. Radha and Sowcar Janaki.

Plot 
Amudha, a girl from a rich family, loves and marries Durai who is from a middle-class family. They beget two children. Amudha wants to live a lavish life whereas Durai thinks love is God. Amudha's brother Manickam spends all his share of father's wealth and comes to live with Amudha. He soon finds the difference of opinion between Amudha and her husband and tries to blow it up. In the meantime, Naganathan, a friend of Durai meets with an accident and dies. Before dying he requests Durai to take care of his wife Thangam and children. Durai works overtime to help Thangam. Manickam tells Amudha that Durai is having an affair with Thangam. As a result, Durai and Amudha fight and get separated. How the family gets together forms the rest of the story.

Cast 

 S. S. Rajendran as Durai Raj
 C. R. Vijayakumari as Amutha
 M. R. Radha as Manikkam
 Sowcar Janaki as Thangam
 Nagesh as Peethambaram
 Kutty Padmini as Kannamma
 K. Balaji as Naganathan
 Gemini K. Chandra as Sundari
 Sandhiya as Bhakyavathi
 S. Rama Rao as Pakkiri
 Baby Sumathi as Shanthi

Soundtrack 
Music was composed by K. V. Mahadevan and lyrics were written by Kannadasan and Panchu Arunachalam.

Reception 
Kanthan of Kalki said those expecting too much from the film would be disappointed.

References

External links 
 

1960s Tamil-language films
1963 films
Films about rape in India
Films scored by K. V. Mahadevan
Indian black-and-white films
Indian drama films
Indian satirical films